Hepatitis A and typhoid vaccine is a combination vaccine to protect against the infectious diseases hepatitis A and typhoid. It is a combination of inactivated Hepatitis A virus and Vi polysaccharide of Salmonella typhi bacteria. Branded formulations include Hepatyrix from GlaxoSmithKline, and ViVaxim and ViATIM from Sanofi Pasteur.

Society and culture

Brand names 
The vaccine is distributed under various brand names in the European Union.

References

Hepatitis vaccines
Combination vaccines
Hepatitis A
Typhoid fever
GSK plc brands
Sanofi